Dean Shek (17 June 1949 – 20 September 2021),  also known as Dean Shek Tin, was a Hong Kong film actor and producer with over 72 film credits to his name. Shek was perhaps best known as Professor Kai-hsien in the 1978 film Drunken Master, Lung Sei in the 1987 film A Better Tomorrow II, and Snooker in the 1990 film The Dragon from Russia.

Early life
With ancestral roots from Tianjin, China, Shek was born as Lau Wai-sing on 17 June 1949, Beijing, before moving to Hong Kong at the age of 3. There, he attended the Shung Tak Catholic English College before studying filmmaking, acting and voice acting at Shaw Brothers Studio's actors training program in 1968.

Career

Acting
Shek began his career as a contracted actor at Shaw Brothers Studio in 1968, making his first brief appearance in the film Twin Blades of Doom (1969). He received more substantial roles at Shaws, in musicals such as The Singing Killer, romantic films including A Time For Love (1970), comedies such as The Human Goddess (1972) and martial arts films such as The Fists of Vengeance (1972).

Shek left Shaw Brothers in 1973. The same year, he appeared in Master with Cracked Fingers, the first film to feature Jackie Chan in a starring role. He made his directorial debut in 1975 with The Monk, and worked as assistant director on Black Alice (1975), A Queen's Ransom (1976), Iron Fisted Monk (1977).

Throughout the late 1970s, Shek continued to work with the likes of Jackie Chan and Sammo Hung on period kung fu films including Broken Oath (1977), Warriors Two (1978), Snake in the Eagle's Shadow (1978), Drunken Master (1978), Odd Couple (1979) and Dance of the Drunk Mantis (1979).

Shek is credited as producer on 22 films, most of which were for the production company Cinema City & Films Co., which he co founded with Karl Maka and Raymond Wong in 1980.
Throughout the 1980s, he appeared in action, crime and comedy films such as Aces Go Places and John Woo's A Better Tomorrow 2 (1987). He also directed four films during the period, which were The Perfect Wife?! (1983), A Family Affair (1984), Kung Hei Fat Choy (1985) and The Family Strikes Back (1986), which were all box office hits.

Final film and retirement from acting
Shek played his final role as Uncle Choi in the 1991 action film, The Raid.

In 1992, Shek retired from acting at the age of 42, after working as a producer in 1992 fantasy horror film, Angel Hunter.

Recently, Shek made a return to acting with a cameo appearance in the 2016 film, The Bodyguard, which is directed by and starring Sammo Hung, and also produced by and guest starring Andy Lau.

Shek last made his public appearance with his former Cinema City & Films Co. collaborators at the 36th Hong Kong Film Awards.

Personal life
In 1979, Shek married Taiwanese actress Lau Chun-yue. They had several children together. Shek's three main personal hobbies were cigar, golf and coffee.

After retiring from the film industry, Shek ventured into and found success in the real estate industry.

Shek died from cancer on 20 September 2021, at the age of 72. He had been diagnosed with the disease two months prior.

Filmography

Films

Television series

References

External links
 
 Hong Kong Cinemagic: Dean Shek Tien

1949 births
2021 deaths
Hong Kong male film actors
Hong Kong film producers
Hong Kong film directors
Hong Kong film presenters
Hong Kong screenwriters
Hong Kong male comedians
Male actors from Beijing
20th-century Hong Kong male actors
Chinese male film actors
Film directors from Beijing
Screenwriters from Beijing